Harpreet Singh (born 29 November 1967) is an Indian former cricketer. He played eleven first-class matches for Delhi between 1989 and 1994.

See also
 List of Delhi cricketers

References

External links
 

1967 births
Living people
Indian cricketers
Delhi cricketers
Sportspeople from Bonn